= Laki, Mizoram =

Coordinates: 22°09′N 93°01′E

Laki is a small village located in the southern part of Mizoram, India. It falls under the jurisdiction of the Siaha district. The population was approximately 1,012 in 2011.
